Bita Lahrakhani Deinabli, better known as Bita Farrahi (born 21 March 1958) is an Iranian actress. She is one of the most famous and internationally acclaimed actresses in Iran.

Career
Bita Farrahi studied art at John Powers’ School in the United States. She worked as professional model for art magazines in California, left the US in 1985, and went back to Iran. Her talent as an actress was found by director Darius Mehrjui. She began her acting career with Hamoun in 1989. She is most noted for willingness to play the roles of intellectual, independent women who are struggling with family and psychological problems.

Filmography
 Hamoun (1989)
 Baanoo (1991 - aka The Lady, released in 1999)
 Kimia (1995 - aka Alchemy)
 Cardboard Hotel (1997)
 Life (1997)
 Velayate Eshgh (2000 - TV Series)
 Eteraz (2000 - aka Protest)
  (2002 - aka A House Built on Water)
 Pedar e Khak (2001- aka The Father of the Dust)
 Telesmshodegan (2004- TV Series)
 Khoon bazi (2006 - aka Mainline)
 Parkway (2007)
 Khak e Ashena (2008)
 Shab va Ghasham be Deltangi (2010)
 Shish va Besh (2011)
 Kharash (aka Scra) (2011)
 Island (2021 - 2022 TV Series)

References

External links

1958 births
Living people
People from Tehran
Actresses from Tehran
Iranian film actresses
Iranian television actresses